Lussat is a commune in the Creuse department in the Nouvelle-Aquitaine region in central France.

Geography

The river Voueize, a tributary of the Tardes, flows eastward through the northern part of the commune. The Tardes forms most of the commune's eastern border.

Population

Sights
 The church, dating from the nineteenth century.
 The remains of a feudal castle, now a house.
 The Landes lake nature reserve.

See also
Communes of the Creuse department

References

External links

Lussat on the Quid website 

Communes of Creuse